Araklı Arena is an indoor volleyball venue located in Araklı town of Trabzon Province, Turkey. Built in 2006, the arena has a capacity of 500 spectators.

In 2007, the venue hosted the 1st Black Sea Games. Volleyball matches for boys were played at this arena during the 2011 European Youth Summer Olympic Festival.

See also
 Araklı
 World Trade Center Trabzon 
 Trabzon Museum
 Trabzon
 Chepni
 Pontic Greeks
 Kadirga Festival

References

Sports venues in Trabzon
Sports venues completed in 2006
Volleyball venues in Turkey